Josef Tomeš (born 18 January 1954 in Prague) is a Czech historian. He studied history and philosophy at Charles University in Prague. He is also chairman of Society of Viktor Dyk (Společnost Viktora Dyka).

References

1954 births
Living people
Writers from Prague
20th-century Czech historians
21st-century Czech historians
Charles University alumni